Lluís Vicenç Gargallo otherwise Luis Vicente Gargallo (circa 1636 — Barcelona, 19 February 1682) was a musician and composer from the Baroque period.

Biography 
Gargallo was born most probably in the Valencian Community. He entered as a child in the choir of the Valencia Cathedral towards 1648-1649 and stayed there until 1651 or 1652. There he received his first musical training given by the mestres de capella Francesc Navarro (until 1650) and Dídac Pontac.

On 7 June 1659, Gargallo succeeded the mestre de capella of the Huesca Cathedral, a position where Vargas i Babán had preceded him. He resigned to the place on 15 November 1667 to join two days later in the Barcelona Cathedral in the same position. As usual, he entered temporarily until the death of the holder, Marcià Albareda (21 August 1673), replacing him after that. Among his disciples in Barcelona, there were the future mestres de capella and composers  and Isidre Serrada. Upon his death, Gargallo was replaced temporarily by Jaume Riera, until  took on the position on 13 July 1682.

Its conserved liturgical production includes 32 works: eight for 4 to 16 voices, a mass for the dead, four masses from 5 to 8 voices and a requiem for two choirs; In addition, he made two oratorios, twenty five villancetes and fifteen tonos. He was the first known Catalan composer to cultivate the oratorio, a typically Baroque musical form.

Works

Liturgic works 

 Benedictus Dominus Israel
 2 Cum invocarem
 3 Dies irae
 Dixit Dominus
 Fratres, sobrii estote et vigilate, for 16 voices
 2 In te Domine speravi
 2 Laudate Dominum
 Libera me Domine, for 8 voices
 2 Magnificat
 Memento Domine David
 Miserere a 8
 3 Missa
 Missa de Batalla a 8
 Missa de Difunts, for 8 voices
 5 Nunc dimittis
 O bone pastor
 2 Qui habitat
 Responde mihi, lliçó de Difunts, for 8 voices

Other sacred and secular works 

 A las fiestas que el cielo, a 4, tono
 Aguas suspended, parad, tono
 Ah de la guarda, a 5, villancete
 Alegría pecadores, a 10, villancete
 Aquí de la fe (in the 1670s), oratory for 10 voices, organ and continuo
 Aurora soberana, a 10, villancete
 Ay que se quema, a 4, tono
 Cuanto más la pierdo de vista, a 5, tono
 Detente, pasajero, a 4, tono
 El fuego i el aire, a 4, tono
 Historia de Joseph (in the 1670s), oratory
 Oiga todo pecador, a 8, villancete
 Oigan qué de quebrados, a 8, villancete
 Olé, que jacarilla que traigo, a 8, villancete
 Para una fiesta, a 11, villancete
 Por celebrar amorosos, a 10, villancete
 Principes persecuti sunt, a 8, villancete
 Que prisión, a 4, tono
 Salve, divina aurora, a 12, tono
 Válgame Dios, qué será, a 12, villancete

Bibliography 

 Francesc Bonastre "Aquí de la fe", oratori de Lluis Vicenç Gargallo (ca. 1636-1682). Estudi i edició, article a Recerca Musicològica 6-7 (1986-1987), p. 77-147 
 Francesc Bonastre "Historia de Joseph", oratori de Lluis Vicenç Gargallo (ca. 1636-1682). Estudi i transcripció Barcelona: Biblioteca de Catalunya, 1986

External links 

Composers from the Valencian Community
Baroque composers from Catalonia
1630s births
1682 deaths